Laminella sanguinea is a species of small air-breathing land snails, terrestrial pulmonate gastropod mollusks in the family Amastridae. This species is endemic to the Hawaiian Islands.

This species is ground-dwelling and often has debris on its shell to camouflage itself.  The biology of Laminella sanguinea is poorly known.  Like many other Hawaiian land snail species, few living specimens have been found in recent years.

References

Fauna of the United States
Laminella
Gastropods described in 1853
Taxonomy articles created by Polbot